The Canal de la Haute-Saône, also canal de Montbéliard à la Haute-Saône, is a canal in eastern France. Although it was designed to connect the upper course of the river Saône (in Conflandey) with the Canal du Rhône au Rhin (in Allenjoie) along Lure and Ronchamp, only the short section between Allenjoie and Botans has been opened in 1923. In the section between Ronchamp and Botans, several locks and tunnels have been built, but it was never used. The section Allenjoie-Botans is 10 km long with five locks. It was closed in 2013.

See also
 List of canals in France

References

External links
 Project Babel

Belfort
Canals opened in 1923
1923 establishments in France